Orobdella is a genus of leeches. It is the only genus in the monotypic family Orobdellidae. They are large annelids, with the largest species (Orobdella octonaria) exceeding  in length, but some are much smaller: mature individuals of Orobdella koikei can measure only . They inhabit the banks of mountain streams and feed on earthworms. The majority of species are endemic to Japan; two species are known from Taiwan, one from Korea, and one from Russian Far East.

Species
Orobdella contains 21 species, including the following:

References

Leeches
Annelid genera